The AG100 is a trainer aircraft, developed from the Cirrus SR22 range, made in China by AVIC.

References

 

Aircraft manufactured in China
AVIC aircraft
Single-engined tractor aircraft
Low-wing aircraft
Civil trainer aircraft